Peter Friedrich Bouché (15 February 1785, in Berlin – 3 April 1856, in Berlin) was a German botanist and entomologist.
His collection is in the German Entomological Institute.

References
Anonym 1858: Accentuated list of British Lepidoptera. Oxford & Cambridge XII - XIII 
Evenhuis, N. L. 1997: Litteratura taxonomica dipterorum (1758-1930). Volume 1 (A-K); Volume 2 (L-Z). Leiden, Backhuys Publishers 1; 2 VII+1-426; 427-871 1: 113–114. 
Ratzeburg, J. T. C. 1874: Forstwissenschaftliches Schriftsteller-Lexikon.  Berlin, Nicolai'sche Buchhandlung : X+1-516 70-72 
Weidner, H. 1983: [Bouche, P. F.]- Ent. Mitt. Zool. Mus. Hamburg 7(113)

German entomologists
1785 births
1856 deaths